David P. Currie (1936–2007) was the Edward H. Levi Distinguished Professor of Law at the University of Chicago Law School, noted for his histories of the Constitution in Congress and the Supreme Court, his casebooks on federal courts and conflict of laws, and his award-winning teaching at the law school. He was the son of legal scholar Brainerd Currie. His wife was Barbara Flynn Currie, Majority Leader of the Illinois House of Representatives.

Born on May 29, 1936, in Macon, Georgia, Currie earned a B.A. from the University of Chicago in 1957, and a LL.B. from Harvard Law School in 1960, where he served on the Harvard Law Review. After clerking for Judge Henry Friendly and then Justice Felix Frankfurter, he joined the University of Chicago Law School faculty in 1962. His books include The Constitution of the United States: A Primer for the People (1988, 2nd ed. 2000); The Constitution in the Supreme Court: The First Hundred Years, 1789-1888 (1985); The Constitution in the Supreme Court: The Second Century, 1888-1986 (1990); the four-volume The Constitution in Congress; and The Constitution of the Federal Republic of Germany (1994). He was also the author of the 1970 Illinois Environmental Protection Act and the first chair of the Illinois Pollution Control Board.

The four volumes of The Constitution in Congress are The Constitution in Congress: The Federalist Period, 1789-1801 (1997); The Constitution in Congress: The Jeffersonians, 1801-1829 (2001); The Constitution in Congress: Democrats and Whigs, 1829-1861 (2005); and The Constitution in Congress: Descent into the Maelstrom, 1829-1861 (2005).

See also 
 List of law clerks of the Supreme Court of the United States (Seat 2)

External links
Obituary
Audio of David Currie reading the U.S. Constitution

1936 births
2007 deaths
American legal scholars
American legal writers
20th-century American lawyers
University of Chicago alumni
Harvard Law School alumni
Law clerks of the Supreme Court of the United States
University of Chicago faculty
University of Chicago Law School faculty
People from Macon, Georgia
Conflict of laws scholars